Zlatari or Zlătari may refer to:

Places 
Bosnia and Herzegovina
 Zlatari, Rudo, a village in Rudo municipality

Bulgaria
 Zlatari, Bulgaria, a village in Tundzha municipality

North Macedonia
 Zlatari, Resen

Romania
 Zlătari, a village in Ungureni Commune, Bacău County
 Zlătari, a village in Goiești Commune, Dolj County
 Zlătari Church in Bucharest 

Serbia
 Zlatari (Brus)

Other uses 
 Boyash, a group of Romani people